Germany–Norway relations are foreign relations between Germany and Norway.

Both countries established diplomatic relations in 1905, after Norway's independence. During World War II, Norway was occupied by Nazi Germany, lasting from 1940 until 1945. Germany has an embassy in Oslo, and Norway has an embassy in Berlin and two consulates, in Düsseldorf and Hamburg.

Both countries are full members of NATO, and of the Council of Europe. As of 2022, there were around 15,000 Norwegians living in Germany and around 10,000 Germans living in Norway.

To promote the German-Norwegian relations in 1982, the German-Norwegian society and 1988, the German-Norwegian Friendship Society were founded.

History
Both what is now Germany and Norway were settled by Proto-Germanic peoples. The Ahrensburg culture, named after the town of Ahrensburg in the German state of Schleswig-Holstein, originated mostly in the North German Plain and were the first known peoples to settle modern-day Norway. By the 2nd century AD, Proto-Norse devolved from Proto-Germanic in Scandinavia. This separated the West Germanic peoples (of whom Germans are associated) and the North Germanic (of whom the Norwegians are associated). 

A large collection of North German towns formed the Hanseatic League.  A kontor was established in Bergen, which since became a major hub of trade with the Germans. The League issued a lot of loans to the Norwegian royalty; this in the long term indebted them, and Norway's economy and trade became subordinate to the League.

Following the dissolution of the union between Norway and Sweden in 1905, the German Empire established relations with the Kingdom of Norway.

During World War II, Nazi Germany led an invasion of Denmark and Norway in Operation Weserübung. The German occupation of Norway lasted until May 1945. Norway, West Germany, and East Germany became members of the United Nations. West Germany and Norway also became members of NATO.

Notable German-Norwegians 
 Carl Arnold (1794–1873), composer
 Rolf Nesch (1893–1975), painter
 Gottfried von der Goltz (born 1964), violinist and conductor
 Peter Dybwad (1859–1921), architect
 Leopold von Ubisch (1886–1965), zoologist 
 Lars Christopher Vilsvik (born 1988), football player

German community of Norway 

See German Norwegians, Reichskommissariat Norwegen and German occupation of Norway.

The German School of Oslo serves Germans living in Oslo.

Related groups: Austrian Norwegians.

Further reading 

 Kristin Haugevik (2017) Diplomacy through the back door: Norway and the bilateral route to EU decision-making, Global Affairs, 3:3, 277-291.

Embassies 
The Embassy of Germany is located in Oslo, Norway. The Embassy of Norway is located in Berlin, Germany.

See also 
 Foreign relations of Germany
 Foreign relations of Norway
 Thomas Götz
 Norway–EU relations

References 

 

 
Norway
Bilateral relations of Norway